Nedim Halilović (born 1 July 1979, in Brčko) is a retired Bosnian-Herzegovinian international football player.

Club career
Nedim Halilović has played for NK Varteks in the Croatian First League. Prior to this, Halilović was active in the Premier League of Bosnia and Herzegovina for FK Sloboda Tuzla. Although Halilovic does not get many starts for the national team of Bosnia and Herzegovina because of his struggling lately he is quickly getting more impressive. He currently plays for the Swedish club Örebro SK and will leave for HNK Rijeka when the transfer window opens again.

On 6 June 2008 it was reported that he left Örebro SK for Croatian HNK Rijeka.

At the end of August 2008, Halilovic decided to follow his last coach at NK Rijeka, Zlatko Dalić to Dinamo Tirana, in Albania, where he signed a contract for the next two years with the 2007–2008 Albanian champions.

In early 2009, he signed a two-year contract with Swedish Div II side, Dalkurd FF, playing in the fourth tier of the Swedish league, guiding the club to promotion in his first season. He finished his career in the Austrian lower leagues.

International career
He made his debut for Bosnia and Herzegovina in a June 2001 friendly match against Malaysia and has earned a total of 14 caps, scoring no goals. His final international was a May 2006 friendly against Iran.

References

External links
 

1979 births
Living people
People from Brčko District
Association football forwards
Bosnia and Herzegovina footballers
Bosnia and Herzegovina international footballers
NK Istra players
FK Sloboda Tuzla players
NK Varaždin players
Örebro SK players
HNK Rijeka players
FK Dinamo Tirana players
Dalkurd FF players
NK Međimurje players
Croatian Football League players
Superettan players
Allsvenskan players
Kategoria Superiore players
Division 2 (Swedish football) players
Ettan Fotboll players
Austrian Landesliga players
Bosnia and Herzegovina expatriate footballers
Expatriate footballers in Croatia
Bosnia and Herzegovina expatriate sportspeople in Croatia
Expatriate footballers in Sweden
Bosnia and Herzegovina expatriate sportspeople in Sweden
Expatriate footballers in Albania
Bosnia and Herzegovina expatriate sportspeople in Albania
Expatriate footballers in Austria
Bosnia and Herzegovina expatriate sportspeople in Austria